Ha-102 was an Imperial Japanese Navy Ha-101-class submarine. Completed and commissioned in December 1944, she served during the final months of World War II, making two supply runs. She surrendered at the end of the war in September 1945 and was disposed of in October 1945.

Design and description

The Ha-101-class submarines were designed as small, cheap transport submarines to resupply isolated island garrisons. They displaced  surfaced and  submerged. They were designed to carry  of cargo.

For surface running, the boats were powered by a single  diesel engine that drove one propeller shaft. When submerged the propeller was driven by a  electric motor. They could reach  on the surface and  underwater. The boats were armed a single mount for a  Type 96 anti-aircraft gun.

Construction and commissioning

Ha-102 was laid down on 8 June 1944 by Mitsubishi at Kobe, Japan, as Small Supply Submarine No. 4602. She was launched on 22 August 1944 and was named Ha-102 that day. She subsequently was towed to the Kawasaki shipyard at Kobe for fitting-out. She was completed and commissioned at Kobe on 6 December 1944.

Service history

Upon commissioning, Ha-102 was assigned to Submarine Squadron 11 for workups. She was reassigned to Submarine Squadron 7 in the 6th Fleet on 10 February 1945 and in mid-February 1945 departed Yokosuka, Japan, to take part in a series of exercises with Ha-101.

Submarine Squadron 7 was disbanded on 20 March 1945, and Ha-101 was reassigned that day to Submarine Division 16 for supply operations. On 5 April 1945, she got underway from Yokosuka to make her first supply run, a voyage to Marcus Island, which she reached in mid-April 1945. After unloading her cargo, she headed back to Yokosuka, arriving there in late April 1945. She set out from Yokosuka in late June 1945 for her second supply run to Marcus Island. She arrived at Marcus on 7 July 1945, discharged her cargo, and got back underway the same day, returning to Yokosuka on 16 July 1945. She then began a conversion to carry aviation gasoline.

Hostilities between Japan and the Allies ended on 15 August 1945, and on 2 September 1945, Ha-102 surrendered to the Allies at Yokosuka. The Japanese struck her from the Navy list on 15 September 1945. She was disposed of in Japan in October 1945; historians disagree on whether she was scrapped at Uraga Dockyard in Uraga or scuttled off Shimizu that month.

Notes

References
 

 
 , History of Pacific War Extra, "Perfect guide, The submarines of the Imperial Japanese Forces", Gakken (Japan), March 2005, 
 Ships of the World special issue Vol.37, History of Japanese Submarines, (Japan), August 1993
 The Maru Special, Japanese Naval Vessels No.43 Japanese Submarines III, Ushio Shobō (Japan), September 1980, Book code 68343-43
 The Maru Special, Japanese Naval Vessels No.132 Japanese Submarines I "Revised edition", Ushio Shobō (Japan), February 1988, Book code 68344-36
 Senshi Sōsho Vol.88, Naval armaments and war preparation (2), "And after the outbreak of war", Asagumo Simbun (Japan), October 1975

Ha-101-class submarines
Ships built by Kawasaki Heavy Industries
1944 ships
World War II submarines of Japan
Maritime incidents in October 1945
Scuttled vessels
Shipwrecks in the Pacific Ocean
Shipwrecks of Japan